Peter Carl Frederik von Scholten (17 May 1784 – 26 January 1854) was Governor-General of the Danish West Indies from 1827 to 1848.

Early life and education

He was born in Vestervig, Thy, Denmark as the son of captain Casimir Wilhelm von Scholten and Catharina Elisabeth de Moldrup.

Career
As a young man, von Scholten joined the Danish army and in 1803 he was appointed ensign in a unit stationed in the West Indies. He was transported to Great Britain when the British occupied the Danish West Indies in 1807. Peter von Scholten married Anne Elisabeth Thortsen, daughter of Danish army captain Johan Thortsen, on October 31, 1810.

Later, he had a career as an officer in Copenhagen, first as a second lieutenant in the Det Sjællandske Jægerkorps (a Danish Jaeger or rifle regiment) in 1808, promoted to premier lieutenant in 1811, he reached the rank of staff captain in 1813. This ledhis becoming adjutant for Frederick VI of Denmark's general adjudant Frants Cristopher Bülow. He served in this role until 1814 when British occupation of the Danish West Indies ended, and he got his first official position on St. Thomas, as customs toller.

Peter von Scholten continued to advance in the Danish military, becoming major in 1816, lieutenant colonel in 1820, commander of Dannebrog in 1828, and major general in 1829.

In 1827, he became acting governor general of St. Thomas. From 1835 to 1848, he served as governor general for all three islands, Saint Thomas, Saint Croix, and Saint John, giving him overall command of the islands. During this period he showed himself a patriarchal administrator trying to lighten the burden of the slaves and to restrain racial tensions. He did this by creating schools for the black population, as well as permitting them private ownership. (Picture of ruins of Von Scholten school, St. Croix.)

In spite of his relatively liberal attitudes, von Scholten was opposed to Christian VIII of Denmark's ruling that every child born of an unfree woman should be free from birth, as he felt that such an arrangement would cause discontent with serious consequences. When the new policy  was brought into effect, he felt himself proven right as a slave rebellion broke out on St. Croix in 1848. Peter von Scholten responded by, on 3 July 1848, emancipating all slaves in the Danish West Indian Islands.

Late years in Denmark and Altona

Shortly thereafter, von Scholten was called back to Denmark. There, a humiliating and hard trial was brought against him, and he was at first denied his pension, although he was later cleared of the charges and acquitted shortly before his death. Von Scholten was the last governor general of the West Indies because of the beginning democratisation of the Danish state and colonial administration.

Peter von Scholten died on 26 January 1854 in Altona, Holstein (present day Germany), leaving little to his heirs. He is buried in Assistens Cemetery, Copenhagen.

Personal life
During his early years on St. Thomas, Peter von Scholten enjoyed a wealthy lifestyle due to his position as customs officer during the surge in trade under the state of war between the nearby Spanish islands and the South American colonial insurgents. He later gained promotion to the position of Governor based on St. Croix. At this time, Peter von Scholten lived with Anna Heegaard (1790–1859), a woman of color. The consensus amongst modern scholars is that Anna Heegaard influenced von Scholten into a policy of more humane treatment of the black population. They bought the country house Bülowsminde. Peter Von Scholten's brother Frederik also served on the West Indian Islands.

 
Peter von Scholten married Anna Elizabeth (Lise) Thortsen in Copenhagen in 1810. The couple had three daughters.

He owned a property at Bredgade 45 in Copenhagen from 1831 to 1849.
After his return to Denmark he acquired the country house Belvedere in Klampenborg on the coast north of Copenhagen.

Peter von Scholten is buried in Assistens Cemetery in Copenhagen.

Cultural references
His fate has inspired several authors.

Peter von Scholten is portrayed in the Danish 1987 drama film Peter von Scholten. Peter von Scholten is played by Ole Ernst.

Bibliography 
 C. F. Bricka (editor), Dansk biografisk Lexikon, first edition, 19 volumes, 1887–1905, Vol. XV. Online edition available: http://runeberg.org/dbl/15/ (pages 255 and 256. Numbered as 257 and 258 in the online edition).

References 

another reference can also be the book by Thorkild Hansen about the Danish slave trade, the third volume(Slavernes Öer)

External links

 On the Danish abolition of slavery: 3 sources by Von Scholten translated to French by French abolitionist Victor Schoelcher in 1843.
 Édit du roi danois Christian VIII du 1er mai 1840
 Ordonnance du gouverneur général des Antilles danoises du 7 mai 1838
 Deux ordonnances locales signées par le gouverneur général danois Von Scholten entre 1828 et 1848

Danish generals
Governors of the Danish West Indies
1784 births
1854 deaths
People from Thisted Municipality
19th century in the Danish West Indies
19th-century Danish politicians
Abolitionists